Smajl Martini Ivezaj (born ca. 1850, Grudë, Ottoman Albania - dead 1889 Diyarbakır) was an Albanian bajraktar from the Grude tribe who led the Albanian forces against the ottomans and montenegrins.  He led his forces against Montenegrins and Ottomans throughout his life, and his deeds were heard of in "The New York Times" in 1911. His daughter, the famous Tringe Smajli, replaced him during the Battle of Vranje in 1911 and the Albanian forces were victorious. Already as an 18 year old Martini fought the Ottoman occupiers and participated in many battles around the Malesia Highlands. He came from a patriotic family, together with Prec and Bace Vuksani, known for battles during the 1780s. In 1835, Ivezaj fought at the castle and church of Shkodra against the Ottomans. During the Battle of Vranje, Smajl Martini was kidnapped and never seen again.

Life 
At the age of 17, he lost his parents and grew up constantly fighting occupiers. He led many victorious forces all around Northern Albania against the Ottomans. The Ottomans, being unable to defeat his forces, followed his activities and captured him in 1883 where he was temporarily isolated. In 1886 the military court of the Sultan sentenced him, together with his men Ded Ula, Ujk Dushi, Shabe Smaku, Gic Gila, Prek Gjetja, Lulash Deda and Lucew Preka to eternal banishment. However, escaping Ottoman custody, he returned to fight with Baca Kurti with the League of Prizren, and later with Ded Gjo Luli in 1878. Much of the history about the Gruda and Hoti tribes were documented by the author Toni Assagazino, who in 1780 wrote of the Malsia Highlands struggle. In 1856, he wrote about the roles of the bajraktars had to protect Albanian lands. According to Andrija Jovicecic, Smajl Martini continued to fight the Montenegrin occupiers with the same force as he did when fighting the Turks. His struggle was heard of in America, and "The New York Times" wrote of his bravery on 21 May 1911. Despite that he lost his parents at the age of 17, he continued to struggle and he lost two sons, Gjon and Pjeter, fighting Montenegro and he also lost his daughter fighting the Ottomans. Small Martini is today a venerated figure amongst Albanians.

Death 
Smajl Martini was kidnapped after Lidhja e Prizrenit 1878-1881 in the year of 1883 by Ottomans and was never heard of again. He was most likely killed.

References 

1850 births
1911 deaths
Malsorë
Military personnel from Podgorica
Albanian Roman Catholics
Activists of the Albanian National Awakening
19th-century Albanian people
20th-century Albanian people
People from Scutari vilayet